BMAA is an abbreviation for the toxin beta-methylamino-L-alanine.

BMAA may also refer to

 Baptist Missionary Association of America
 British Microlight Aircraft Association